The Men's sprint Nordic combined competition for the 2006 Winter Olympics was held in Pragelato, Italy. It took place on 21 February.

Results

Ski Jumping

Forty-nine athletes entered the ski jumping portion of the sprint; each made one jump, which was judged in the same fashion as the Olympic ski jumping competition. The scores for these jumps were used to calculate the deficit with which each athlete began the cross-country portion of the event. Each one point behind the leading score of Georg Hettich was equivalent to four seconds of time deficit.

Cross-Country
The start for the 7.5 kilometre race was staggered, with a one-point deficit in the ski jump portion resulting in a four second deficit in starting the cross-country course. This stagger meant that the first athlete across the finish line, Felix Gottwald was the overall winner of the event.

References

Nordic combined at the 2006 Winter Olympics